Harry Gibbs (January 27, 1893 – 1966) was an English-born boilermaker and political figure in Saskatchewan. He represented Swift Current from 1944 to 1956 in the Legislative Assembly of Saskatchewan as a Co-operative Commonwealth Federation (CCF) member.

He was born in Rochdale, Lancashire, the son of Thomas Edward Gibbs and Hannah Townsend, and came to Canada in 1911. Gibbs served in the Canadian Expeditionary Force during World War I. In 1917, he married Grace May Fordham. Gibbs served on the council for Swift Current, Saskatchewan.

References 

Saskatchewan Co-operative Commonwealth Federation MLAs
20th-century Canadian politicians
Boilermakers
1893 births
1966 deaths
Canadian military personnel of World War I
Date of death missing
Place of death missing
British emigrants to Canada
People from Rochdale